Pouilley may refer to
Places
Pouilley-Français, commune in eastern France
Pouilley-les-Vignes, commune in eastern France
Surname
Georges Pouilley, French swimmer